Gangapur City is a city, nagar parishad located, near Sawai Madhopur City in Gangapur City District  in the Indian State of Rajasthan.  Population-wise, it is the 18th largest city in Rajasthan.

History 
King Kushaliram Haldiya established Gangapur and originally named it Kushalgarh (Hindi: कुशालगढ़). Gangapur took its current name from Kushaliram's brother, Gangaram. In older days, Gangapur City was the cultural capital of Jaipur State and was known as "The Jugad of the East". Today, Gangapur is primarily known for being an important part of the West Central Railway.
Gangapur City is now getting famous for Nazimwala Talab (kushalgarh Bird Sanctuary), where a number of migrating birds are coming in the winter season.

Geography 
Gangapur City is located in the eastern part of Rajasthan in Sawai Madhopur; it is situated 75 km from district headquarters at Sawai Madhopur and 140 km from Jaipur. The city's area is about 12 km2.

Demographics 
The 2011 Census of India considered Gangapur City as an urban agglomeration. The city has a population of 119,090; males constitute 53% of the population and females constitute 47%.

Literacy rates 

The average literacy rate in Gangapur is 79.12%.

Religions 

Hinduism is majority religion in Gangapur City, with 71.91% of the city as followers. Islam is the secondmost common religion, with 26.32% following it in the city.

Climate 
Gangapur City is in a subtropical dry climate that experiences summer, winter, and the wet season. Temperature may rise above 40 °C in summers and can be low as 5 °C in winters. The average precipitation is 24.48 cm. Humidity is about 5–10% in summers and rises to about 75% in rainy seasons.

Gangapur City Wards Map 
Before 2019 total 40 wards in Gangapur city.

Currently total 60 wards in Gangapur City.

Transportation

Railways 
 is a railway station on the Delhi–Kota–Vadodara–Mumbai railway line and it is abbreviated as GGC. Many of the major trains on this route stop at the station. It is in the West Central Railway Zone under the Kota Division. Gangapur City is directly connected to major cities like Delhi, Mumbai, Jaipur, Kota, Agra, Indore, Mathura, Patna, Jammu, Amritsar, and Udaipur.

Station also serve as only railway source to places like Karauli, Sapotara, Bamanwas, Lalsot, Kailadevi, Piplai which did not have railway connectivity.

Another railway line has been proposed between Dholpur and Gangapur City to connect Gangapur City to the Delhi–Bhopal–Mumbai rail route and to provide connectivity to Karauli.

Roadways 
Gangapur City has a Rajasthan roadways bus stand for Rajasthan government buses and a private bus stand for privately owned buses. Gangapur City has regular government and private buses to cities like Jaipur, Dausa, Karauli, Dholpur, Gwalior, Ajmer, Pushkar, Hindaun, Alwar,Bikaner, Bhilwara, sikarand Sawai Madhopur.

Major roads passing through Gangapur City are:
 National Highway 23: Dholpur–Karauli–Gangapur–Lalsot–Kothun
 Rajasthan SH-1: Jhalawar–Kota–Sawai Madhopur–Gangapur City–Bharatpur–Mathura
 Rajasthan SH-25: Gangapur City–Sikandra–Bandikui–Rajgarh–Alwar–Tijara–Bhiwadi–Daruhera

The distances of major cities from Gangapur City are:
 Jaipur: 141 km
 Sawai Madhopur: 75 km
 Bharatpur: 145 km
 Kota: 206 km
 New Delhi: 238 km
 Udaipur: 458 km
 Ajmer: 274 km
 Karauli: 34 km
 Gwalior: 203 km
 Alwar: 142 km

Airways 
The nearest airports to the city are Jaipur International Airport in Jaipur and Indira Gandhi International Airport in New Delhi.

Medical facilities 
Gangapur City has a government hospital situated in Sursagar, which has an operation theatre, post-mortem room, maternity ward, and laboratory. It also has more than 5 multi specialty hospitals. Riya hospital, garg hospital etc.

Banking 
All major Indian banks have branches in Gangapur City.

 Allahabad Bank
 Axis Bank
 Bank of Baroda
 Baroda Rajasthan Kshetriya Gramin Bank
 Central Bank of India
 Canara Bank
 HDFC Bank
 ICICI Bank
 Indian Bank
 Indian Overseas Bank
 Oriental Bank of Commerce
 Punjab National Bank
 State Bank of India
 Union Bank of India
 UCO Bank
 United Bank of India
 Yes Bank

Media 
 Dainik Bhaskar
 Dainik Jagran
 Dainik Navajyoti 
 Rajasthan Patrika
 The Times of India

Dainik Bhaskar, Dainik Navajyoti and Rajasthan Patrika are the major newspapers read in Gangapur City, which are printed in the city. Other newspapers include The Times of India, Bajriya Ki Bhore, Badti Kalam, 
Rashtradut, Kushalgarh Ka Suraj. Chamkti Aankhe and Dainik Jagran.

G News Portal is the mostly watched news portal of Gangapur City, which shows live news of local incidents.

Internet Service Provider 
  Airtel
  BSNL
  Jio 
  Radinet
  Railwire

External links 
 https://www.gangapur.city
 https://www.bhaskar.com/local/rajasthan/sawai-madhopur/gangapur/
 https://geoiq.io/places/Gangapur-City-(M)/yQSgXcvBJm
 https://www.giveindia.org/all-ngos/rajasthan/gangapur-city/
 https://www.mapsofindia.com/maps/rajasthan/gangapur.html
 https://women.raftaar.in/ghumne-ki-jagah/rajasthan/gangapur_city

References 

Cities and towns in Sawai Madhopur district